The Union Auto Company is located in Eau Claire, Wisconsin. In 2007, the building was added to the National Register of Historic Places some time ago.

History
The building was constructed for automobile sales and repairs. From 1917 to 1975, multiple auto-related businesses ran their operations from the site. In 1977, the upper portion of the building was converted into apartments and in 1980, what was once a showroom was converted into a bar and restaurant. Additionally, other parts of the building are now used for religious functions and the basement serves as a parking garage.

References

Commercial buildings on the National Register of Historic Places in Wisconsin
Apartment buildings in Wisconsin
Restaurants in Wisconsin
Buildings and structures in Eau Claire, Wisconsin
Commercial buildings completed in 1917
National Register of Historic Places in Eau Claire County, Wisconsin